Clutton may refer to:

People with the surname
Alma Clutton (1873–1955), Canadian photographer
Henry Hugh Clutton (1850-1909), English surgeon
Henry Clutton (1819 –1893), designer and architect
Ralph Clutton (1902–1957), English cricketer

Places
Clutton, Somerset, a village in Bath and North East Somerset, England
Clutton, Cheshire